John Buckley (born 2 June 1958 in Ballyvolane, Cork) is an Irish former sportsperson. He played hurling with his school, the North Monastery, his local club Glen Rovers, and was a member of the Cork senior inter-county team from 1982 until 1986.

Playing career

Club
Buckley played hurling with his local club Glen Rovers, as well as playing football with the Glen’s sister club, St. Nick’s. He first came to prominence as a dual player at minor level in the seventies.  In 1976 Buckley was a dual county minor championship medalist as Carrigview and Blackthorns were accounted for in the finals.

Buckley subsequently joined the club's senior teams, however, he soon gave up football to concentrate on his hurling.  It was a lean period for Glen Rovers with the club losing county championship deciders in 1980, 1981 and 1988.

In 1989 Buckley lined out in his fourth county final.  Sarsfield's provided the opposition and an exciting hour of hurling followed.  At the full-time whistle 'the Glen' were the champions by 4-15 to 3-13 and Buckley finally collected a county senior championship.

After surrendering their title in 1990 Glen Rovers were back in the county final again in 1991.  Midleton were the opponents that time, however, Buckley's side were defeated by 1-17 to 1-8.  Following this defeat Buckley decided to retire from club hurling.

Inter-county
Buckley first came to prominence on the inter-county scene as a member of the Cork under-21 football team in the late seventies.  In 1979 he captured a Munster title in this grade following victories over Kerry and Clare. Unfortunately, he missed out on the chance to win an All-Ireland medal as Down defeated Cork in the championship decider.  Buckley later gave up football entirely to concentrate on hurling.

In 1982 Buckley made his senior championship debut, just as Cork were about to return to the big time with a new team.  That year he collected his first Munster medal following Cork's 5-31 to 3-6 drubbing of Waterford.  The subsequent All-Ireland final pitted Cork against Kilkenny, with 'the Rebels' installed as the red-hot favourites.  All did not go to plan as Kilkenny dominated.  Buckley started at right wing-back, however, Christy Heffernan was the hero of the day as he scored two goals in a forty second spell just before half-time. Ger Fennelly captured a third goal in the second-half as Kilkenny completely trounced ‘the Rebels’ by 3-18 to 1-15.

O'Donoghue claimed a second Munster medal in 1983 as Waterford fell heavily by 3-22 to 0-12 for the second consecutive year.  After defeating Galway in the All-Ireland semi-final Cork squared up to Kilkenny in the All-Ireland final for the second year in-a-row.  Once again Kilkenny dominated the game, assisted by a strong wind in the first-half, and hung on in the face of a great fight-back by Cork.  At the full-time whistle Kilkenny emerged victorious by 2-14 to 2-12. For the second consecutive year Buckley ended up on the losing side on All-Ireland final day.

In 1984 Buckley was relegated to the substitutes' bench.  Because of this he missed out on Cork's Munster and All-Ireland triumphs in the GAA's centenary year.  In spite of not playing Buckley did collect winners' medals as a non-playing sub.

Buckley continued playing with Cork for the next two years, however, he failed to regain his place on the starting fifteen.  He was a member of the panel for all of Cork's 1986 season, however, he was dropped for the All-Ireland final against Galway.

Buckley’s last game for Cork was a National Hurling League clash with Kilkenny in late 1986. He was sent off in the game and was never selected to play for his county again.

References

1958 births
Living people
Cork inter-county hurlers
Cork inter-county Gaelic footballers
Dual players
Glen Rovers hurlers
People educated at North Monastery
St Nicholas' Gaelic footballers